Homoeothrix may refer to:
 Homoeothrix (cyanobacteria), a genus of bacteria in the order Oscillatoriales
 Homoeothrix (fly), a genus of flies in the family Tephritidae